Telele is an uninhabited islet of Funafuti, Tuvalu. The estimate terrain elevation of the island is 12 metres above sea level.

See also

 Desert island
 List of islands

References

Uninhabited islands of Tuvalu
Pacific islands claimed under the Guano Islands Act
Funafuti